A smirk is a smile evoking insolence, scorn, or offensive smugness, falling into the category of what Desmond Morris described as Deformed-compliment Signals.

A smirk may also be an affected, ingratiating smile, as in Mr Bennet's description of Mr Wickham as making smirking love to all his new in-laws in the novel Pride and Prejudice.

Etymology
The word derives from Old English smearcian, via Middle English smirken.
It is from the same root as smile, from Proto-Germanic *smar-, but with a velar root extension -k- (with intensive or frequentative function) particular to English also found in talk (from the root of tell) and  stalk (from the root of steal) etc.

The specific meaning of a mocking or unpleasant, malicious smile or grin develops in Early Modern English, but until the 18th century, it could still be used in the generic sense "to smile".

Historical examples
George Puttenham in the 16th century described what he called “a mock with a scornful countenance as in some smiling sort looking aside”.

"A constant smirk upon the face, and a whiffling activity of the body, are strong indications of futility," the Earl of Chesterfield once wrote in a letter to his son.

German-born psychiatrist Fritz Perls considered the most difficult patients to be the clever know-it-alls, recognisable by what he called “a specific kind of smile, a kind of smirk, a smirk that says, 'Oh, you're an idiot! I know better. I can outwit you and control you'”.

See also

Schadenfreude
Sneer

References

English words
Facial expressions